Ascot is a rural locality in the Toowoomba Region, Queensland, Australia.

Geography 

Ascot is on the Darling Downs. Its southern boundary follows Kings Creek, a tributary of the Condamine River.  The area is heavily developed for agriculture except for elevated areas in the east.

Mount Sibley is a neighbourhood in the north-west of the locality, presumably taking its name from the nearby mountain of the same name in neighbouring East Greenmount. The mountain was named after James Sibley, a pastoralist and publican, who leased the Clifton pastoral run in the early 1840s.

History
Mount Sibley Provisional School opened on 1907. On 1 January 1909 it became Mount Sibley State School. It closed circa 1952. The school was located at 565 Mount Silbley Road.

Education 
There are no schools in Ascot. The nearest primary school is Pilton State School in neighbouring Pilton to the south-east, Emu Creek State School in neighbouring East Greenmount to the north-west and Nobby State School in neighbouring Nobby to the south-west. The nearest secondary school is Clifton State High School in Clifton to the south-west.

References

External links

Toowoomba Region
Localities in Queensland